The University of Geneva (French: Université de Genève) is a public research university located in Geneva, Switzerland. It was founded in 1559 by John Calvin as a theological seminary. It remained focused on theology until the 17th century, when it became a center for enlightenment scholarship. Today, it is the third largest university in Switzerland by number of students.

In 1873, it dropped its religious affiliations and became officially secular.  In 2009, the University of Geneva celebrated the 450th anniversary of its founding. Almost 40% of the students come from foreign countries.

The university holds and actively pursues teaching, research, and community service as its primary objectives. In 2016, it was ranked 53rd worldwide by the Shanghai Academic Ranking of World Universities, 89th by the QS World University Rankings, and 131st in the Times Higher Education World University Ranking.

UNIGE is a member of the League of European Research Universities (including academic institutions such as Amsterdam, Barcelona, Cambridge, Heidelberg, and Milan) the Coimbra Group and the European University Association.

History
The university was founded in 1559 as the Academy of Geneva (Académie de Genève) by John Calvin, as a seminary administrated by the Company of Pastors, to be the center of public education in Protestant Geneva. With the goal of educating not only pastors but also magistrates for the republic, in 1565 the academy began the teaching of Law.

During the French annexation of Geneva (1798–1813), the school was reorganized into a more universal format, with the introduction of degrees and its division in faculties. This process of modernization continued into the period of national Restoration

Location
The University of Geneva is located in several districts in the eastern part of the city and in the nearby city of Carouge (on the left bank of the Lake Léman and the Rhône), and the different buildings are sometimes very distant from each other (the Battelle buildings are for instance more than three kilometers away from the Bastions). The oldest building (1559) is the Collège Calvin, and is no longer a university building. Lectures are given in six different main locations, Les Bastions, Uni Dufour, Sciences I, II and III, Uni Mail and Uni Pignon, Centre Médical Universitaire (CMU), and Battelle; as well as in other less important locations (for instance part of the Mathematics Section is located at the second and (partly) third and sixth storeys rented by the university in an office building in Carouge).

Uni Bastions
Built between 1868 and 1871, Uni Bastions is the symbol of Geneva's academic life. It is located in the middle of a park and is host to the faculty of Protestant Theology and to the Faculty of Arts.

Uni Dufour

Its architecture was inspired by Le Corbusier. It hosts the Rectorat and the administration of the university.

Uni Mail

It is Switzerland's biggest building dedicated to social sciences. It currently hosts the Faculty of Law, of Economics and Management, of Psychology and Education and the Faculty of Translation and Interpreting.

Organisation
The University of Geneva is structured in various faculties and interfaculty centers which are representing teaching, research and service to society in the various disciplines.

Faculties

The university is composed of nine faculties:
 Faculty of Sciences
 Faculty of Medicine
 Faculty of Humanities
 Faculty Geneva School of Economics and Management (GSEM)
 Faculty Geneva School of Social Sciences (G3S)
 Faculty of Law (Geneva Law School)
 Faculty of Theology
 Faculty of Psychology and School of Education
 Faculty of Translation and Interpreting

Interfaculty centers
The university is composed of fourteen interfacultary centers. Amongst others: 
Institute for Reformation History (the Reformation)
Interfaculty Center for Informatics (computer science)
Institute for Environmental Sciences (energy policy)
The Global Studies Institute 
Interfaculty Center of Gerontology (gerontology)
Swiss Center for Affective Sciences (affective science)

Associated institutions
The university has also several partnerships with the nearby institutions, where students at the university may take courses.
 Graduate Institute of International and Development Studies (IHEID) 
 Bossey Ecumenical Institute (of the World Council of Churches)
 Wyss Center for Bio- and Neuro-engineering
 Swiss National Supercomputing Centre
 Art-Law Centre
 Center for Biomedical Imaging(CIBM) 
 University Centre of Legal Medicine (CURML)
 The Institute for Work and Health (IST)

Finances
The University of Geneva had a budget of roughly 760 million CHF for the year 2016. It mostly comes from the cantonal subventions, the other notable contributors being the federal state and the tuition fees.

Libraries and press

Libraries
UNIGE's library facilities are spread across four sites.

Uni Arve is host to seven libraries: the Bibliothèque Ernst & Lucie Schmidheiny, the Bibliothèque d'Anthropologie, the Bibliothèque du Centre universitaire d'informatique, the Bibliothèque Georges de Rham (Mathematics), the Bibliothèque de l'Institut des Sciences de l'environnement (ISE), Bibliothèque de l'Observatoire (Astronomy) and the Bibliothèque des Sciences de la Terre et de l'environnement.

Uni Bastions hosts the language libraries, as well as the university's libraries focused on history and musicology.

Uni CMU is home to an extensive collection of medical issues. Besides, it is also hosts the Centre de documentation en santé (CDS) and the Bibliothèque de l’Institut de la médecine et de la santé et de l’Institut d’éthique biomédicale (IHMS – IEB).

Uni Mail's collection is focused on the following themes: Economics and social sciences, Law, Psychology and Learning Sciences, Translation and Interpreting, European studies, French as a foreign language and Musicology. Besides, it also hosts UNIGE's multimedia library.

Press
The journal de l'UNIGE is released biweekly. Its purpose is to ease communication inside the university, to inform the students about the research being carried at UNIGE, to convey new opinions and to inform students and teachers of upcoming university events via l'Agenda.

Campus is released monthly with the objective to ease communication between the scientific community and the citizens and to be a "bridge between science and city".

Academics

Admission and fees 
To be enrolled in a bachelor programme, one must hold a Swiss maturity diploma or a secondary diploma considered by the University of Geneva to be equivalent. If the degree was not pursued in French, applicants must pass an eliminatory French language test at the beginning of September, which consists of an oral and a written comprehension test and of a piece of argumentative writing. Tuition fees are of CHF 500 per semester.

Academic year
UNIGE's academic year runs from mid-September to mid-June. It is divided in two semesters, each one being concluded by an examination session, held respectively at the beginning of January and at the beginning of June. An examination session is held at the end of August and beginning of September as a retake for students who failed their January or June examinations.

During the three days before the start of the new academic year, the Journées d'accueil (Welcome Days) are organized by the university to introduce the new students to the city and the facilities, tips are also given on how to succeed at university. A second chapter including city tours, outdoor concerts and animations is also organized by the student association UniAccueil (AUA) to celebrate the new academic year.

Teaching and degrees
Before 2005, the university applied various very different models, depending on Faculties, and sometimes even on Departments (or "Sections"). Some Faculties applied the French education model of granting academic degrees, with some minor differences: demi-licence (two years), trois-quarts de licence (three years), licence (four years), diplôme d'études approfondies and diplôme d'études superieures spécialisées (DEA/DESS) (1–2 years), and doctorate (3–5 years).

The university now follows the requirements of the Bologna process: bachelor's (three years), master's (1–2 years), in some departments or sections Master of Advanced Studies (1–2 years), doctorate (3–5 years).

UNIGE offers more than 240 types of diplomas: about 30 bachelor's degrees, 70 masters and 78 doctorates. It also provides more than 200 programmes of continuing education in various sectors.

International partnerships
Students at UNIGE have the possibility to study abroad for a semester or a year during their degree. Partner universities include Free University of Berlin, Harvard Law School, École Normale Supérieure, Trinity College Dublin, Erasmus University of Rotterdam, Université Libre de Bruxelles, King's College London, McGill University, HEC Montreal, University of Ottawa, University of Oxford, Uppsala University, Johns Hopkins University, University of Michigan, UCLA, University of Southampton, University of Sydney, University of Tokyo.

Research 
The key sectors of research at the University of Geneva are sciences (molecular biology, bio-informatics, etc.), elementary physics, astrophysics, economics, social sciences, psychology, chemistry, biochemistry and biophysics.

UNIGE is home to six national research centers: in genetics (Frontiers in Genetics), in material sciences (MaNEP), in study of emotions (Affective Sciences), in chemical biology (with EPFL), in study of mental illness (Synaptic, with EPFL and Unil), in study of life path (with Unil). UNIGE also carries research in international studies since the creation in 2013 of the Global Studies Institute, in finance with the Geneva Finance Research Institute, and in environmental studies, with the creation in 2009 of the Institut des sciences de l'environnement.

Famous discoveries have been made by researcher working at UNIGE including the discoveries of extrasolar planets by Michel Mayor, and of quantum teleportation by Nicolas Gisin.

Rankings

The University of Geneva is consistently ranked one of the top universities in the world.

Global rankings
In 2016, the University of Geneva is ranked 53rd overall in the world according to the Shanghai Ranking. In 2012, it was ranked 69th overall in the world according to the Shanghai Ranking, 74th overall according to the QS ranking and 133rd overall according to the THE ranking. In 2006, Newsweek ranked the university 32nd in the world.

The QS World University Rankings ranked the University of Geneva as follows:

The Times Higher Education World University Rankings ranked the University of Geneva as follows:

Subject rankings
In molecular biology, the impact of the research carried in Geneva was ranked 4th in Europe by Times Higher Education for the period 1999–2009, directly behind the University of Oxford. In physics, UNIGE was ranked sixth.

The QS 2013 subject ranking placed the University of Geneva at the 21st place in the field of Pharmacy and at the 49th place in Philosophy. In every subject, the university was ranked in the world's top 200.

Other rankings
In the 2013 QS ranking, the university was ranked 24th in the world for most international faculty and 20th in the world for most international student body.

Student body
In 2016, 16,530 students were studying at UNIGE, of whom 61% were female. 37% of the students were non-Swiss, originating from 151 countries. 
4,449 teachers and collaborators, of whom 49% are female, are working for UNIGE.

Student life

Sports
The Bureau des sports organizes all the sports related activity at UNIGE. Free sports lessons are given everyday and it suffices to show one's student card to access. Other lessons organization with the university's partners demand a small fee. UNIGE is home to the Geneva university championships in basketball, indoor football, rowing, badminton, outdoor football. The university also sends teams to the Swiss university championship in badminton, indoor football, skiing, basketball, fencing, football, golf, ice-hockey, table tennis and volleyball. UNIGE also provides special schedules for students wishing to pursue their high level sporting career and to study at the same time.

Associations
Alumni UNIGE is the alumni association of the University of Geneva, it offers a network of several thousand people to its members, as well as other advantages, such as discount prizes, special events, access to the official networking platform. Atout-lettres is the alumni association of the literature students of the university, founded in 1997. Its purpose is to prepare the professional insertion of the literature students, to establish links between literature student and the working world and to promote the formation given by the  Faculté de Lettres.

Alumni 
Over the course of its history, a sizeable number of UNIGE alumni have become notable in their fields, both academic, and in the wider world. Affiliates of the University of Geneva have won 10 Nobel prizes. Graduate alumni (Martin Hairer and Vaughan Jones) have won 2 Fields Medals.

The university has hosted several Nobel laureates as students, researchers and/or professors: Norman Angell (1872–1967), Nobel Peace Prize 1933; Karl Gunnar Myrdal (1898–1987) Nobel Prize in Economic Sciences 1974; Daniel Bovet (1907–1992), Nobel Prize in Medicine 1957; Niels Kaj Jerne (1911–1994), Nobel Prize in Medicine 1984; Maurice Allais (1911–2010), Nobel Prize in Economic Sciences 1988; Edmond H. Fischer (1920–2021), Nobel Prize in Medicine 1992; Martin Rodbell (1925–1998), Nobel Prize in Medicine 1994; Alan Jay Heeger (born 1936), Nobel Prize in Chemistry 2000; Werner Arber (born 1929), Nobel Prize in Medicine 1978; Kofi Annan (1938–2018), Nobel Peace Prize 2001; Michel Mayor (1942-- ) and Didier Queloz (1966-- ), Nobel Prize in Physics 2019 (jointly with James Peebles).

It has also hosted or graduated three Fields Medal laureates: Vaughan Jones (1952–2020), laureate in 1990, Stanislav Smirnov (born 1970), laureate in 2010 and Martin Hairer (born 1975), laureate in 2014.

Notable scholars

Notable alumni

In fiction
 James Bond briefly studied at the University of Geneva, as did his creator, Ian Fleming .

See also
 List of early modern universities in Europe
 List of largest universities by enrollment in Switzerland
 International Academy of Sport Science and Technology (AISTS)

References

External links

 
Scholars and Literati at the University of Geneva (1559–1800), in Repertorium Eruditorum Totius Europae/RETE.

University of Geneva
Schools in Geneva
1559 establishments in Europe
Educational institutions established in the 1550s
16th-century establishments in Switzerland